Italy participated at the 2015 Summer Universiade in Gwangju, South Korea.

Medal summary

Medal by sports

Medalists

References
 Country overview: Italy on the official website
 Official FISU Yearbook

Italy
Italy at the Summer Universiade
Summer Univ